Royal Marines Tamar is a Royal Marines military installation specialising in landing craft training and operations located on the northern bank of Weston Mill Lake at the north end of HMNB Devonport at Plymouth in Devon.

History
Weston Mill Lake (at one time Devonport's coaling yard) was converted in the 1980s to provide frigate berths for the Type 22 fleet. After the Type 22 fleet had been decommissioned and the lake had been re-designated the base for its amphibious warfare ships, the Royal Navy decided to create a centre of excellence for landing craft, hovercraft and fast boats there: the centre, which handles both training and operations, was opened by Prince Harry on 2 August 2013.

47 Commando (Raiding Group) Royal Marines and its training unit, 10 (Landing Craft) Training Squadron, moved from RM Poole to RM Tamar at that time and 539 Assault Squadron RM, which undertakes operations for 1 Assault Group, moved from RM Turnchapel to RM Tamar.

References

Royal Marines bases
Military history of Devon
Royal Navy bases in England